Amaury Pi-Gonzalez is a Spanish language Major League Baseball announcer. He is the only major league baseball announcer to have broadcast, in Spanish, for four major league teams.  From 2003 to 2006, Pi-Gonzalez was broadcasting for 2 teams in two separate leagues, SF Giants and Seattle Mariners. In 2009-2010 Pi-Gonzalez worked with the Spanish Beisbol Network. Inducted into the Cuban Sports Hall of Fame, (Miami, FL) 2004 and the Hispanic Heritage Baseball Museum and Bay Area Radio Hall of Fame, 2010, San Francisco, CA. Has been listed on the Ford C Frick Broadcaster Award nominating ballot since 2004.

After previous stints with the Oakland Athletics, San Francisco Giants, and Seattle Mariners, Pi-Gonzalez joined the Los Angeles Angels of Anaheim for the 2007 season.

He is the play by play Spanish broadcaster for FSN West TV-Los Angeles Angels of Anaheim production.

Pi-Gonzalez also spent seven seasons as the Spanish radio voice of the Golden State Warriors. He has also covered the Super Bowl, boxing and soccer for Spanish radio.

Born in Cuba, Pi-Gonzalez emigrated to Miami in 1961. He is a member of the Cuban Professional Sports Hall of Fame.

References
Official website

Press release upon joining Angels

Major League Baseball broadcasters
Living people
Year of birth missing (living people)
Cuban emigrants to the United States
Cuban sportspeople
Oakland Athletics announcers
San Francisco Giants announcers
Seattle Mariners announcers
Los Angeles Angels of Anaheim announcers
Golden State Warriors announcers
National Basketball Association broadcasters
Boxing commentators
National Football League announcers
Association football commentators